Bladen is an extinct town in Glynn, in the U.S. state of Georgia.

History
A post office called Bladen was established in 1892, and remained in operation until 1937. In 1900, the community had 47 inhabitants.

See also
List of ghost towns in Georgia

References

Landforms of Glynn County, Georgia